Jimmy Lim Cheok Sang, born 1944, Penang, Straits Settlement (now part of Malaysia), is an ethnic-Chinese Malaysian architect.

Early life and career
Lim was born in Penang in 1944. He has stated that he was interested in architecture from an early age due to the renovation activities of his grandfather, and due to a visit to the Kek Lok Si temple. In 1959 he left Penang for studies in Sydney, Australia, where he attended boarding school. In 1964 he began studying at the school of architecture of the University of New South Wales. Lim remained in Australia for 13 years before returning to Malaysia in 1972 to work as an architect for the Project Architects firm. His first project in Malaysia was a semi-conductor plant in Subang for Motorola.

In 1978 Lim began his own architecture firm, CSL associates, which is now called Jimmy Lim Design. His design for the Salinger House won a Aga Khan Award for Architecture during the 1996–1998 cycle of that prize. Other prominent designs of his include the Schnyder house (AKA Precima House) which was designed for Swiss businessman Rolf W. Schnyder, the Menara Prudential office tower in Kuala Lumpur, Resorts World Awana in Genting Highlands, and the TY Chiew house. In 2012 he received the SIA-Getz Architecture Prize for Emergent Architecture in Asia for sustainability. Lim was president of the Malaysian Institute of Architects, (Pertubuhan Akitek Malaysia, or PAM), and received their gold medal for lifetime services to the architecture profession.

Lim is an advocate of natural design and the use of wood in construction. Lim also advocates prioritising interior over exterior design.

Lim Guan Eng defamation lawsuit
In December 2013 an article quoting Jimmy Lim entitled "Guan Eng has failed, says NGO", about what he characterised as the destruction of Malaysian heritage in developments schemes carried out under the government of Penang Chief Minister Lim Guan Eng, was published on the Malaysian online news portal Free Malaysia Today. The article was particularly critical of the 2009 demolition of the 200-year old Kampung Buah Pala, and stated that Lim Guan Eng was indifferent to the fate of Indian communities. Lim Guan Eng then sued Jimmy Lim as well as other parties alleging defamation, and in August 2013 received a decision at the George Town High Court in his favour ordering the defendants to pay RM300,000 in damages and RM30,000 in legal costs. This decision, however, was overturned in 2016 on appeal to the Malaysian Court of Appeal, on the grounds that the article taken as a whole was not defamatory. Judge Hamid Sultan Abu Backer, the chair of the court, described the article as "written in a temperate tone".

Personal life
Lim is married to the Malaysian educator and cancer-awareness advocate Mui Siew Koon who followed him to Australia. His daughter Lim Wei Ling is a prominent gallery owner and runs the Malaysian heritage NGO, Badan Warisan, that he co-founded.

References

1944 births
Malaysian architects
Living people